Stefan Lehner (born 1957 in St. Gallen, Switzerland) is a Swiss designer who lives and works in Utrecht, Netherlands. He studied Philosophy, Mathematics, Language and Communication Coach in Enterprises.

From 1978–2004 he lived and worked in Fribourg, Switzerland, and also studied philosophy, mathematics, language and Communication Coach in Enterprises, and was member of the Committee of the Art Laboratory Belluard Bollwerk International.

Design career
His career as a designer started in 1986, with the first construction of a metal furniture's based on recycled materials from the industry. In 1988 he founded the Atelier En-Fer and work with Cristina Lanzos until 1999. In 2004 he transferred the Atelier En-Fer to the old town of Utrecht, The Netherlands.

The peculiar characteristic of his work is that the furniture, objects and interiors are based on used materials and reuse former or hidden functions of the recycled materials. The transformations are made with complex materials (industry), but also with cheap trash (packaging). The metamorphose of the materials should be useful and comfortable, surprising and make smile. His projects bring to the houses the sober beauty of industrial objects but simultaneously take profits from their former function: a spring damps weights (banc, office chair), a car seat has a good ergonomics (arm chair, sofa, reception room), a chain tracks and stays flexible (arm chair, bed, couch) and a supermarket trolley rolls and can be pushed together for storage (seat, child car, coat rack). The main topics related to his work are: research recycling and function reuse (studies and constructions re-using functions in new objects), furniture prototypes (authentic materials for personalised use), interior design, international projects (collaboration with designers and artists in Brazil).

Fascination for inventions and industrial materials 
As a child he was always drawing and inventing machines and collected a lot of thrown objects. Since this time he has visited scrap yards and factories and collected interesting used materials. Searching for a new life for those objects, he started in 1985 with the construction of furniture prototypes. These principles are also applied for bigger installations: kitchen (Spain, Switzerland), bathroom (Spain), bar (Fribourg), reception (Bern), office (Fribourg), jewellery shop (Zurich), flower shop (Fribourg). Serial production and new row materials - For Chesterfield he developed a recycling ashtray and produced 1001 pieces for sponsored trendy restaurants, bars and concert rooms. Later he started to use also other recycled row materials in combination with metals: rubber, wood, glass and animal bones.

Exhibitions 
Personal Expositions
 2006 - Personal Exposition in the Sociale Verzakeringsbank Amstelveen
 1999 - Designshop „Einzigart“ in Zürich
 1992 - Forum d’Art Contemporain in Siders
 1990 - Galerie Delikt in Freiburg

Group expositions
 2006 - 100%design Rotterdam
 2006 - Woonbeurs Amsterdam
 2003 - “Sägerei“ on the Belpberg
 2002 - “Stock“ in Fribourg
 2000 - Form Forum Switzerland in Basel
 1999 - Usine, CAC et EAS in Siders
 1999 - Form Forum Switzerland in Basel
 1998 - Usine Vuille in Fribourg
 1996 - Craft Council Switzerland in Bern
 1995 - Jung Economic Chamber in Montreux
 1992 - „Das bessere Produkt“ in Rüschlikon
 1992 - Neuchâtel Art

Projects for enterprises and artists
 2006 - Interior Design for Imagemakers Rotterdam
 2001 - Lighting, tools and showcase for flower shop Hertig in Fribourg
 2000 - Furnishing for jewellery shop Riekmann in Zürich
 2000 - Set design for “Théatre de l’Ecroux”
 1998 - Video room for Geneva Fair representing the Canton Fribourg
 1997 - Office design for Cantonal administration
 1997 - Scene Lighting for Music Club “Temps Moderne“ in Vevey
 1996 - Sponsor objects for Marlboro and Chesterfield
 1995 - 1001 ashtrays for Chesterfield
 1995 - Set design for Dance Performance of “Da Motus!”
 1993 - Bar for Music Club Fri-Son in Fribourg
 1992 - Set design for Dance Performance of “Da Motus!”
 1991 - Reception for Trimedia Bern

Prizes 
 1996 - 1st Prize: Art Competition for new building of the Engineer
 1989 - 1st and 3rd Prize: Plum’art in Fribourg
 1987 - Special prize: Tabl’art in Fribourg
 1986 - 1st Prize: Tabl’art in Fribourg

References 
 Eco-Friendly Guide to Dutch Design, in Travel and Leisure Magazine, New York, 2009
 Club of Amsterdam, 2008
 "Machinemeubels" in Het Financieele Dagblad, FD Persoonlijk, September 2006
 "Stefan Lehner, le magicien du recyclage" in "Rendez-vous Deco", Paris 8-2006
 "Madeliefjes en tuimelaars", 100%design Rotterdam in "Bloem en Blad", 7-2006
 100%design 2006, Roterdam
 "Atelier En-Fer, paradis de la récup' ", Plaisir, 10-2003
 "Paradies de la recup', l'atelier En-Fer transforme les déchets en design" La Liberté, 20-3-2003
 "Aus alten Sachen Kunst gemacht", Berner Zeitung, 1-12-2002
 "Design de magasin avant-gardiste", Le fleuriste, 4-2002
 Ausstellungskatalog des FormForum Schweiz' 00, 28-4-2000
 Ausstellungskatalog des FormForum Schweiz' 99, 5-3-1999
 "Metallabfälle werden kreativ weiterverarbeitet", Berner Zeitung, 10-7-1997
 "Die Ästhetik der Ketten", Freiburger Nachrichten, 30-12-1996
 "Das Experiment 1+1+...", Bund, 18-10-1996
 "Die Ästhetik industrieller Nützlichkeit", LPZ, 14-10-1996
 "Design écologique", Le Jurassien, 6-10-1996
 "Profession Artiste", Catalogue du Congrès de la Jeune Chambre Economique Suisse, 3-10-1996
 "L’écologie et le design cohabitent", La Liberté, 28-8-1996
 "Die Ästhetik der Ketten", Porträt von Roderick von Kauffungen, Schweizerische Depeschenagentur, 26-8-1996
 "Kunstwettbewerb: Eine Portion frisches Grün für die neue Ingenieurschule", Freiburger Nachrichten, 2-3-1996
 "La nouvelle Ecole d’Ingénieurs sera décorée par un labyrinthe", La Liberté, 4-3-1996
 "L’en-fer du meuble", Habiter & Jardin, 3-1993
 "Et si les déchets pouvaient resservir?", Le Confédéré, 27-10 1992
 "Quand le recyclage est drôle, utile et agréable à l’œil", La Liberté, 24-10-1992
 "Les déchets renaissent", Le Nouvelliste, 22-10-1992
 "L'utilité de la ferraille", La Suisse, 9-10-1992
 "En-Fer au FAC", Le Confédéré, 9-10-1992
 "Déchets dans le salon", Journal de Sierre, 9-10-1992
 "Chercheurs d’or irrécupérables", Le Nouvelliste, 6-10-1992
 "Des trésors parmi les déchets", WWF Valais, 9-1992
 "Research Recycling", Kongressdokumentation von "Das Bessere Produkt", 7-5-1992
 "Design von Wert", Schweizer Wirtschaftsmagazin Bilanz, 4-1992
 "Design-Trends: Müllmetamorphosen", Jung-Unternehmer, 11-1991
 "Les trésors de la récupération", Le Nouveau Quotidien, 19-11-1991
 "Il existe déjà beaucoup trop d’objets!", Hebdo, 21-2-1991
 "Déchets sublimé: La seconde vie des objets", La Liberté, 19-10-1990
 "Galerie Delikt: Eigenartige Möbelobjekte", Freiburger Nachrichten, 9-10-1990

References

Swiss designers
Living people
1957 births
People from Fribourg
People from St. Gallen (city)